Glucan 1,4-alpha-maltohexaosidase (exo-maltohexaohydrolase, 1,4-alpha-D-glucan maltohexaohydrolase) is an enzyme with systematic name 4-alpha-D-glucan maltohexaohydrolase. This enzyme catalyses the following chemical reaction

 Hydrolysis of (1->4)-alpha-D-glucosidic linkages in amylaceous polysaccharides, to remove successive maltohexaose residues from the non-reducing chain ends

The products have the alpha-configuration.

References

External links 
 

EC 3.2.1